Sligo Bay is a natural ocean bay in County Sligo, Republic of Ireland.

Geography 

Sligo Bay is opened between Aughris Head (South side) and Roskeeragh Point (North). The inner part of the bay is divided into three smaller bodies of water, hosting the estuaries of three rivers: Drumcliff, Garavogue and Bonet.  
The river Garavogue reaches the bay in its central part, named Sligo Harbour, which is divided from the outer part of the bay by three small islands: Coney, Oyster and Maguins. On the southern branch of Sligo Bay also has its mouth the Ballisodare River, near the village of the same name.

Landforms and islands
The bay is characterised by the peninsulas jutting out into it, which create vast areas of sandy beach at low tide, along with the tidal islands which are only accessible at low tide. The notable landforms within the bay and its peninsulas are:
Maugherow Peninsula
Rosses Point Peninsula
Coolera Peninsula
Oyster Island
Coney Island
Maguins Island

History 
Large beaches and tidal plains located around the bay are a good habitat for shellfish. This kind of food attracted settlers since the Stone Age, as demonstrated by a number of middens discovered in the area by archeologists.

During the centuries in waters of the bay occurred several shipwrecks. Quite well studied is the wreck of Labia (25 September 1588), a 728-ton Venetian ship. Shipwrecks became almost common during the following centuries and their number started to decrease with the decline of the port of Sligo in the 20th century.

Transport 
Sligo Airport is located on the bay's shore, at the foot of Knocknarea, a hill which overlooks the peninsula between Sligo Harbour and Ballysadare Bay (Bonet estuary).

Lighthouses

There are four lighthouses in Sligo Bay.

Blackrock (Sligo) Lighthouse

The 25m high Blackrock lighthouse  in Sligo Bay is notable for having external steps until halfway up the tower.

Lighthouses near Rosses Point

Sligo Bay hosts three lighthouses near Rosses Point, the Metal Man, Lower Rosses and Oyster Island lighthouses.

Hiking 
Sligo Bay is concerned by the Donegal to Mayo section of the Wild Atlantic Way.

Nature 

Ballysadare Bay hosts a well known seal colony.

The estuaries area is protected under European legislation being listed as a NATURA 2000 site; it is also a Natural Heritage Area, defined and managed by the Irish National Parks & Wildlife Service.

See also
 Wild Atlantic Way

References

External links

INFOMAR page on Sligo Bay (Geological Survey of Ireland)

Bays of County Sligo
Protected areas of County Sligo
Natura 2000 in Ireland